

Hoa concentrations in Vietnam

Ho Chi Minh City: Cho Lon
Tiền Giang
Đồng Nai
Kiên Giang
Trà Vinh Province
Hai Phong (most emigrated or forced out during the 1979 crisis).
Bạc Liêu
Cà Mau

Returned Overseas communities in China

The Chinese Vietnamese population in China now number up to 300,000, and live mostly in 194 refugee settlements mostly in the provinces of Guangdong, Guangxi, Hainan, Hong Kong, Fujian, Taiwan, Yunnan and Jiangxi. More than 85% have achieved economic independence, but the remainder live below the poverty line in rural areas.
Hong Kong
Yuen Long
Taiwan
Penghu（澎湖越南華僑難民營）
Other Provinces
Overseas Chinese Farm Region|lt=Overseas Chinese Farm Region|zh|華僑農場

Hoa descent in other countries

United States
Boston: Chinatown; and larger presence in Dorchester section
Chicago: New Chinatown
Dallas
Denver
Detroit: Madison Heights
Honolulu: Chinatown
Houston: Chinatown
Los Angeles metropolitan area: San Gabriel Valley, Orange County, Chinatown
New York City: Chinatown
Oklahoma City: Asia District
Orange County: Little Saigon
Philadelphia: Chinatown
San Francisco Bay Area: San Francisco, San Jose, Fremont, Oakland
Seattle: International District

Canada
Calgary
Edmonton
Montreal: Chinatown, Brossard
Ottawa
Toronto: Chinatown, Toronto, Mississauga, North York, Kitchener, Ontario, Waterloo, Ontario
Windsor, Ontario 
Winnipeg: Chinatown, Winnipeg
Vancouver: Chinatown, Richmond
Victoria, British Columbia

Australia
Melbourne: Box Hill, Footscray, Springvale
Sydney: Cabramatta, Bankstown

France
Paris: 13th arrondissement
Marseille

United Kingdom
London: Hackney, Lewisham

Footnotes